Escadron de Chasse 2/3 Champagne (Fighter Squadron 2/3 Champagne) is a French Air and Space Force (Armée de l'air et de l'espace) fighter squadron currently stationed at BA 133 Nancy – Ochey Air Base  which flies the Dassault Mirage 2000D.

See also

 List of French Air and Space Force aircraft squadrons

References

Fighter squadrons of the French Air and Space Force
Military units and formations established in 1915